Coronation Medal may refer to:

 King Edward VII Coronation Medal (1902)
 King Edward VII Police Coronation Medal (1902)
 King George V Coronation Medal (1911)
 King George V Police Coronation Medal (1911)
 King George VI Coronation Medal (1937)
 Queen Elizabeth II Coronation Medal (1953)